Pedro María Artola Urrutia (born 6 September 1948) is a Spanish retired footballer who played as a goalkeeper.

During his 14-year professional career he represented Real Sociedad and Barcelona, appearing in 217 La Liga matches.

Club career
Born in Andoain, Gipuzkoa, Artola played three full seasons for Real Sociedad's reserves, San Sebastián CF, before joining the first team permanently in 1970. During most of his spell with the Basques he backed up Javier Urruticoechea, with 27 of his 30 La Liga appearances coming in 1974–75 as they finished in fourth position with the second-best defensive record (32 goals suffered, to UD Salamanca's 29).

In 1975, aged almost 27, Artola signed with FC Barcelona, appearing in only 25 league matches in his first two years combined but becoming the starter subsequently. He won the Ricardo Zamora Trophy as the best goalkeeper in 1977–78, adding the campaign's Copa del Rey with the Catalans, one of seven major honours with the club – in this competition's round-of-16, in the last minutes of the 8–0 home routing of Getafe Deportivo following a 3–3 away draw, he took a penalty after petition from the Camp Nou faithful, and missed it; he was also in goal in one of the two UEFA Cup Winners' Cup finals won by Barça, the 1979 4–3 win against Fortuna Düsseldorf in Basel.

Former Real Sociedad teammate Urruti signed for Barcelona in 1981, and eventually again won the battle for first-choice with Artola, who only appeared in three games in 1983–84, retiring from football at the age of 35.

International career
Artola was selected by Spain for the UEFA Euro 1980 tournament in Italy, as Urruticoechea. He did not earn any caps for the national side, however.

Honours

Club
Barcelona
Copa del Rey: 1977–78, 1980–81, 1982–83
Supercopa de España: 1983
Copa de la Liga: 1983
UEFA Cup Winners' Cup: 1978–79, 1981–82

Individual
Ricardo Zamora Trophy: 1977–78

References

External links

Biography at Porteros Vascos de Leyenda 

1948 births
Living people
People from Andoain
Footballers from the Basque Country (autonomous community)
Spanish footballers
Association football goalkeepers
La Liga players
Tercera División players
Real Sociedad B footballers
Real Sociedad footballers
FC Barcelona players
Spain amateur international footballers
UEFA Euro 1980 players
Sportspeople from Gipuzkoa